Stadionul Mircea Chivu is a multi-purpose stadium, located in Reșița, Romania. It has a capacity of 12,500 people and is the home ground of CSM Reșița. The stadium is named after Mircea Chivu, the father of soccer player Cristian Chivu, former captain of the Romania national football team.

External links
Stadionul Mircea Chivu. soccerway.com

 

Football venues in Romania
Buildings and structures in Caraș-Severin County
Sport in Reșița
Multi-purpose stadiums in Romania
CSM Reșița